Aasaiyil Oru Kaditham is a 1999 Indian Tamil-language romantic family drama film directed by Selva. The film stars Prashanth, Kausalya, Anand, and Riva Bubber alongside an ensemble supporting cast including Vivek, Vijayakumar, Sathyapriya, Rajan P. Dev, and Santhana Bharathi. The film was the Tamil remake of Telugu film Snehitulu. The music was composed by Deva with cinematography by K. S. Selvaraj and editing by Venkateswara Rao. Upon the film's release on 17 December 1999, it became a critical and commercial failure.

Plot
Karthik (Prashanth) is on his way from Chennai to attend his friend Anand's (Anand) wedding in a village. In the bus stand, Karthik sees a girl (Kausalya) and gets attracted towards her. To his surprise, he meets the same girl in the village again. Karthik writes a love letter to her and gives it through a small girl. Karthik gets shocked now as he finds that the girl is Lakshmi and is also Anand's fiancé.

Lakshmi's relatives get furious upon knowing that someone has given a love letter to her, and they keep searching for the guy who has written it. Once the wedding is complete, Karthik reveals to everyone that it was him who had given the love letter to Lakshmi and apologizes that he did not know that Lakshmi is the bride in the wedding. Lakshmi's relatives forgive him, while Anand and Lakshmi leave to Chennai.

However, Anand gets suspicious that Lakshmi might have an affair with Karthik and starts suspecting her. He also keeps secretly monitoring her while being alone at home. Anand's father (Rajan P. Dev) is also a sadist, and he tortures Lakshmi. Anand openly reveals to Lakshmi that he does not trust her and accuses of having an illegitimate affair with Karthik. Lakshmi is worried and keeps trying to win the trust of her husband.

Meanwhile, Shantini (Chandini) is Karthik's college mate who loves him, but he does not reciprocate. Despite Karthik avoiding Shantini, she tries to woo him continuously. Finally Karthik accepts Shantini's love, and her father (Santhana Bharathi), a local rich man, decides to get them married.

Unfortunately, Anand's suspicion over Lakshmi increases, and he starts torturing her. He even goes to the extent of throwing acid on her face. One day, Lakshmi's cousin comes to meet her, but Anand behaves very rude towards him. Lakshmi requests her cousin not to inform about the torture  that she undergoes to her father (Vijayakumar) as he will keep worrying. Lakshmi decides to commit suicide and goes to a nearby bridge, but she luckily gets saved by Karthik. Lakshmi reveals about Anand's behavior to Karthik, and he feels bad that it was him who is responsible for all the fiasco.

Karthik goes to meet Anand and again tries to prove that he does not have an affair with Lakshmi. However, Anand does not listen to him. Anand also decides to spoil Karthik's relationship with Shantini. Anand meets Shantini and informs that Karthik and Lakshmi are in an illegitimate relationship, which shocks Shantini. Shantini's father gets furious upon hearing this, and he sends a few goons to beat Karthik, but Karthik beats them up and comes to meet Shantini. He decides to break up with Shantini as she did not trust him and instead believed all the false stories cooked up by Anand.

Lakshmi could no longer bear her husband's torture and decides to return to her parents. Karthik meets Lakshmi and decides to accompany during her travel until the village. However, Anand informs Lakshmi's father that Lakshmi has decided to elope with Karthik. Lakshmi's father also believes Anand's words and accuses Lakshmi and Karthik when they reach the village.

Lakshmi worries that even her parents did not trust her. Anand and his father come to Lakshmi's village and try to tarnish her image in front of the villagers. However, Lakshmi's cousin (who met Lakshmi at her home before) comes to the spot and clarifies about the hardships that she had faced. Lakshmi's father realizes his mistake and apologizes to her. Meanwhile, Lakshmi decides to ditch Anand and throws the “thali” on his face. She also does not want to stay with her parents as they too doubted her character. Lakshmi decides to walk away from the village, while Karthik says that he will accompany her as a good friend. The movie ends with both Karthik and Lakshmi leaving the village together as good friends.

Cast

 Prashanth as Karthik
 Kausalya as Lakshmi (Voice dubbed by Jayageetha)
 Anand as Anand
 Riva Bubber as Chandini
 Vivek as Ramalingam
 Vijayakumar as Lakshmi's father
 Sathyapriya as Lakshmi's mother	
 Rajan P. Dev as Anand's father
 Santhana Bharathi as Chandini's father
 Charle as Servant
 Vaiyapuri as Jambulingam
 Dhamu as Sundaralingam
 Thalapathy Dinesh

Soundtrack

The film score and the soundtrack were composed by Deva. The soundtrack, released on 21 October 1999, features five tracks.

Reception
Indolink wrote "Though the movie has some novel appealing situations, its lack of focus on the central theme leads to boredom at times." Chennai Online wrote "It is a fairly engaging film, one of the better movies from Selva. Comedy, sentiment and action blend cleverly. The closing scene is commendable, one of those 'different' frames that film-makers these days aim for". Oocities wrote "This movie could have been very very great, but the shot misfired, and so we're left with a mediocre work. If the storyline had been concentrated better, and Prasanth's character had come only when necessary [..], the movie might have been much much better.".

References

1999 films
Tamil remakes of Telugu films
1990s Tamil-language films
Indian romantic drama films
Films scored by Deva (composer)
Films directed by Selva (director)